The 2019 Indonesia President's Cup Finals was the two-legged final that decided the winner of the 2019 Indonesia President's Cup, the fourth season of Indonesia's pre-season premier club football tournament organised by PSSI.

Unlike all the previous editions, it was a two-legged match home-and-away format.

The finals was contested between local rivals Persebaya and Arema. The first leg was hosted by Persebaya at Gelora Bung Tomo in Surabaya on 9 April, while the second leg was hosted by Arema at Kanjuruhan in Malang three days later.

Arema won the finals 4–2 on aggregate for their second Indonesia President's Cup title.

Teams

Venues

Road to the final

Note: In all results below, the score of the finalist is given first (H: home; A: away).

Format
The final was played on a home-and-away two-legged basis. The away goals rule would be applied, and extra time would be played if the aggregate score was tied after the second leg and away goals rule. If the aggregate score was still tied after extra time, a penalty shoot-out would be used to determine the winner.

Matches
All times were local, WIB (UTC+7).

First leg

Second leg

References 

Piala Presiden Finals
Piala Presiden Finals